Water Eaton is an area of Milton Keynes, Buckinghamshire, England and in the civil parish of Bletchley and Fenny Stratford (in which its population is enumerated for Census purposes).  It is to the south of, and contiguous with, Fenny Stratford. It is one of the ancient Buckinghamshire villages that became incorporated as part of Milton Keynes in 1967.

History 
By the date of designation of Milton Keynes, Water Eaton had already been virtually absorbed by the 1960s Greater London Council-built London overspill district known as the Lakes Estate. The GLC was very proud of the Lakes Estate, declaring it to be the finest in modern architecture for a working class estate, based on the Radburn design concept pioneered in Radburn, New Jersey. The Lakes Estate was one of a number of developments around Bletchley and Fenny Stratford in the 1950s and 60s, intended to resettle people from poor-quality housing in war-damaged London.

Name 
The village name 'Eaton' is Old English language word referring to a farming settlement, and the whole means 'farm by a river'. It is first mentioned in the 1086 Domesday Book (as simply Eaton); when it was held by Geoffrey de Montbray, and was listed as having a Mill.

See also 
 "Bigger, Better, Brighter" — Bletchley in the 20th Century

References 

Areas of Milton Keynes
Radburn design housing estates